Johnsen Bacuna (born 6 August 1985) is a Curaçaoan footballer who plays as a midfielder for Berkum.

Career

Bacuna started his career with Dutch fifth tier side . In 2010, he signed for DIO Groningen in the Dutch sixth tier, helping them earn promotion to the Dutch fifth tier. Before the second half of 2011–12, Bacuna signed for Dutch fourth tier club Harkemase Boys, where he suffered relegation to the Dutch fifth tier. In 2015, Bacuna signed for Berkum in the Dutch fifth tier, helping them earn promotion to the Dutch fifth tier.

Personal life

He is the older brother of professional footballers Leandro Bacuna and Juninho Bacuna.

References

External links
 

1985 births
Association football midfielders
Curaçao footballers
Derde Divisie players
Harkemase Boys players
Vierde Divisie players
Living people
Netherlands Antilles international footballers